Hotel Majestic in San Francisco, California is a historic hotel built in 1902.  Because of the 1906 earthquake and fire that was stopped at Van Ness Avenue, it became the longest-operating hotel in the city.

References

Hotels in San Francisco
Hotel buildings completed in 1902
Western Addition, San Francisco